KZHE (100.5 FM) is a radio station broadcasting a Classic Country format. Licensed to Stamps, Arkansas, United States, it serves the Texarkana area.  The station is currently owned by A-1 Communications, Inc.

External links

Classic country radio stations in the United States
ZHE